Juvonen is a Finnish surname. Notable people with the surname include:

 Helmi Juvonen (1903–1985), American artist
 Helvi Juvonen (1919–1959), Finnish writer
 Nancy Juvonen (born 1967), American film producer
 Arja Juvonen (born 1967), Finnish politician
 Janne Juvonen (born 1994), Finnish ice hockey goaltender

Finnish-language surnames